Lucideon (formerly Ceram) is an independent materials development, testing and assurance company based in Stoke-on-Trent and in the US. Lucideon owns testing facilities around the world.

History
The British Refractories Research Association was formed in 1920. The pottery industry was required by the Import Duties Advisory Committee in 1937 to create a research association, so the British Pottery Research Association was formed in 1937. The two combined in April 1948 as the British Ceramic Research Association.

The main building on Queens Road in Penkhull was opened by the Duke of Edinburgh in December 1951. In May 1986 it changed its name to British Ceramic Research Ltd, having been incorporated as a company on 18 November 1985.

From the late 1990s the company traded under the abbreviated name Ceram. On 1 February 2014 the company name changed to Lucideon Limited.

Structure
Lucideon is situated south of the University Hospital of North Staffordshire.

Lucideon incorporates:
 UK Headquarter] - (formerly CERAM Research Ltd)
 Assurance Services - Lucideon CICS Limited
 US Laboratories - (formerly M+P Labs) based in Schenectady, New York, Greenville, South Carolina and offices in Raleigh, North Carolina

Lucideon's laboratories and techniques are accredited by the United Kingdom Accreditation Service (UKAS).

Function
Lucideon provides materials development, technologies, consultancy and testing and analysis to a diverse range of industries; principally healthcare, construction, ceramics, aerospace, nuclear and power generation.

References

External links
 Lucideon Website
 Assurance Division
 Company History

Ceramic engineering
Ceramics manufacturers of England
Companies based in Stoke-on-Trent
1948 establishments in England
Materials science institutes
Materials testing
Organizations established in 1948
Science and technology in Staffordshire
Scientific organisations based in the United Kingdom